Chandana Banerjee (born 1953) is an Indian actress, model and beauty queen. She was the winner of first edition of Femina Teen Princess. She represented India at International Teen Princess 1967 held in Chicago, Illinois on 26 May 1967 and was crowned 1st Runner Up there. After that she became a model in India.

References

External links
 Pageantopolis: Teen Princess
 Indpedia: Miss India

Indian beauty pageant winners
Female models from West Bengal
1953 births
Date of birth missing (living people)
Living people